Krasny Luch is a rural locality (a village) in Nagornoye Rural Settlement, Petushinsky District, Vladimir Oblast, Russia. The population was 36 as of 2010. There are 17 streets.

Geography 
Krasny Luch is located on the Kirzhach River, 39 km northwest of Petushki (the district's administrative centre) by road. Vetchi is the nearest rural locality.

References 

Rural localities in Petushinsky District